Metsakasti is a village in Viimsi Parish, Harju County in northern Estonia. As of 2011 Census, the settlement's population was 772, of which the Estonians were 549 (71.1%).

Metsakasti is connected to the centre of Tallinn by Tallinn Bus Company's route nr. 38 (Viru keskus – Muuga), average traveling time is about 30 minutes.

References

External links

Villages in Harju County